Kremna may refer to:
 Kremna, a village in Užice Municipality, Serbia
 , a village in Prnjavor Municipality, Republika Srpska, Bosnia and Herzegovina
 Kremna, an ancient Roman city in Pisidia, south western Turkey.

See also 
 Kremná, is a village and municipality in Stará Ľubovňa District, Slovakia